Cruise ships are large passenger ships used mainly for vacationing. Unlike ocean liners, they typically embark on round-trip voyages to various ports-of-call, where passengers may go on tours known as "shore excursions". They may carry thousands of passengers in a single trip, and are some of the largest ships in the world by the gross tonnage(GT), bigger than many cargo ships. Cruise ships started to exceed ocean liners in size and capacity in the mid-1990s; before then, few were more than 50,000GT. In the decades since, the size of the largest vessels has more than doubled. There have been nine or more new cruise ships added every year since 2001, most of which are 100,000GT or greater. In the two decades between 1988 and 2009, the largest cruise ships grew a third longer (268 m to 360 m), almost doubled their widths (32.2 m to 60.5 m), doubled the total passengers (2,744 to 5,400), and tripled in volume (73,000 GT to 225,000 GT).

Cruise ships are organized much like floating hotels, with a complete hospitality staff in addition to the usual ship's crew. Modern cruise ships, while sacrificing some qualities of seaworthiness, have added amenities to cater to nautical tourists, with recent vessels being described as "balcony-laden floating condominiums". The "megaships" went from a single deck with verandas to all decks with verandas, and feature ameneties such as theaters, fine-dining and chain restaurants, spas, fitness centers, casinos, sports facilities, and even amusement park attractions.

Cruise ships require electricity for powering both hotel services and for propulsion. Cruise ships are designed with all the heavy machinery at the bottom of the ship and lightweight materials at the top, making them inherently stable even as ship designs are getting taller and taller, and most passenger ships utilize stabilizer fins to further reduce rolling of tall ships in heavy weather. While some cruise ships use traditional fixed propellers and rudders to steer, most larger ships use propellers that can swivel left and right to steer the ship, known as azimuth thrusters, which allow even the largest ship designs to have adequate maneuverability.

Cruise ships are operated by cruise lines, which are companies that market cruises to the public. In the 1990s, many cruise lines were bought by much larger holding companies and continue to operate as brands or subsidiaries of the holding company. For instance, Carnival Corporation & plc owns both the mass-market Carnival Cruise Line, focused on larger party ships for younger travelers, and Holland America Line, whose smaller ships cultivate an image of classic elegance. The common practice in the cruise industry in ship sales and orders is to list the smaller operating company, not the larger holding corporation, as the recipient cruise line of the ship.

In service
, there are 64 passenger ships over 135,000GT in service. The first ships over that size were the  ships from Royal Caribbean Group's Royal Caribbean International (RCI). These ships, which debuted in 1998 at over 137,000GT, were almost 30,000GT larger than the next-largest cruise ships, and were some of the first ships designed to appeal to "non-cruisers", with features like a four-deck-high,  atrium down the center of the ship, an ice rink, and a climbing wall. In 2005, the five Voyager-class ships were overtaken by the 149,215GT  (QM2), the first non-RCI passenger ship over 135,000GT and the only passenger ship currently in service that classifies itself as an ocean liner. The QM2 was surpassed by RCI's 155,889 GT -class vessels in 2006, which were in turn overtaken by RCI's first of six planned  vessels in 2009.

Since 2008, other cruise lines have been ordering 135,000+GT ships. MSC Cruises introduced the first of four 137,936–139,072 GT s in 2008, followed in 2017 by both the 153,516 GT  and the 171,598–181,541 GT . Norwegian Cruise Line debuted the 155,873 GT Norwegian Epic in 2010, the first ship outside of the Oasis class with a double-occupancy capacity of over 4,000, and introduced the 145,655 GT  in 2013 and the 165,157–169,116-GT Breakaway-plus class in 2015. Cruise lines belonging to Carnival Corporation & plc, Princess Cruises and P&O Cruises, debuted the first of seven 142,714 GT+  ships in 2013, and the corporation's Carnival Cruise Line, Costa Cruises, and AIDA Cruises debuted the first of seven planned 133,596–135,225 GT  ships in 2016. , the first of Carnival Corporation's nine planned  ships, debuted in 2018 at 183,858GT, with future ships in the class planned for Costa, P&O, Carnival, and AIDA.

On order
, 25 passenger ships were on order or under construction with a publicly announced size of over 135,000GT. RCI has three s on order, with expected delivery between 2023 and 2026, the first of which coming in at 250,800 GT, which would make it the largest cruise ship in the world. It also has a sixth Oasis-class ship, on order for 2023, and while its exact size is not published, RCI has previously stated that each new Oasis-class ship will be a little larger than the last. Celebrity Cruises, which is owned by RCI's parent company Royal Caribbean Group, will introduce two 140,600 GT  ships in 2023 and 2025, and TUI Cruises, a joint venture between Royal Caribbean Group and TUI Group, are introducing a new class of 161,000 GT cruise ships in 2024 and 2026.

Asia-based Dream Cruises, which went bankrupt due to the COVID-19 pandemic, had been planning to take delivery of two 208,000 GT  ships in 2021 and 2022, which would have been the first ships over 200,000GT not built for RCI, with the largest maximum passenger capacity, 9,500, of any ship. One unfinished ship, formerly the Global Dream, was sold to Disney Cruise Line and is expected to debut in 2025, while the other was sent for scrapping.

MSC Cruises has three additional  ships planned for 2024, 2025, and 2027, and at 215,800GT and a capacity of 6,762 passengers; they will have the highest passengers capacities and will be largest ships operated by a cruise line other than Royal Caribbean. They also have one ship on order from the Meraviglia Plus class for delivery in 2023.

Carnival Corporation has two more 183,200–183,900 GT Excellence-class ships planned to debut in 2022 and 2023 for P&O Cruises and Carnival Cruise Line, respectively. Costa will take delivery of two 135,000 GT Vista-class ships in 2023 and 2024 for a joint venture between Carnival Corporation and China State Shipbuilding Corporation (CSSC).

The Prima-class ships are expected to be 142,500GT and carry 3,215 to 3,550 passengers.

Disney Cruise Line will launch two more 144,000 GT  ships in 2024, and 2025. These ships will have 1,250 staterooms, like the line's previous two ships, but will be 14,000GT larger than those ships and powered by liquified natural gas fuel.

See also

 List of cruise lines
 List of largest cruise lines
 List of cruise ships
 List of largest passenger ships
 List of largest ships by gross tonnage
 List of longest ships
 List of largest container ships
 Timeline of largest passenger ships

References

External links

Transport-related lists of superlatives
Largest
Cruise Ships, Largest
Largest things by volume